Alexander Aitken (8 January 1869 – 7 July 1925) was a Scotland international rugby union player.

Rugby Union career

Amateur career

Aitken played club rugby for Edinburgh Institution F.P.

Provincial career

He played for Edinburgh District against Glasgow District in the 1888 inter-city match.

He played for East of Scotland District in their match against West of Scotland District on 26 January 1889.

International career

He was capped just the once for Scotland, in 1889. He played in the match against Ireland on 16 February.

Family

His father was Alexander Dunn Aitken (1818–1902) and his mother was Elizabeth Smith McClelland (1832-1915). He was one of their ten children.

References

1869 births
1925 deaths
Scotland international rugby union players
Scottish rugby union players
Edinburgh Institution F.P. players
Edinburgh District (rugby union) players
East of Scotland District players
Rugby union players from Edinburgh
Rugby union forwards